N'Guessankro is a town in central Ivory Coast. It is a sub-prefecture of Béoumi Department in Gbêkê Region, Vallée du Bandama District.

N'Guessankro was a commune until March 2012, when it became one of 1126 communes nationwide that were abolished.

In 2014, the population of the sub-prefecture of N'Guessankro was 13,986 13,986.

Villages
The 17 villages of the sub-prefecture of N'Guessankro and their population in 2014 are:

Notes

Sub-prefectures of Gbêkê
Former communes of Ivory Coast